The North Korean Postal Service or Korean Post is operated by the Ministry of Post and Telecommunications and Communication Maintenance Bureau, which oversees postal communications, telegrams, telephone services, TV broadcasts, newspapers and other related matters.

Background and history

As with much of North Korea, internal information regarding the Postal Service is difficult to come by and what is learned usually comes from stories of North Korean defectors, the limited number of international business activities and a handful of North Korean research institutes.

Prior to the famine in the 1990s, the telegram service usually took less than a week and the government provided bicycles to the offices to ensure delivery. However, during the famine (also called the "Arduous March"), postal delivery became more and more sporadic due to food, electricity and fuel shortages. In some cases it took over a month for a letter to be sent from the north of the country to Pyongyang, which is only a few hundred kilometres away and, at times, it is rumoured that postal train employees would burn the letters in order to keep warm.

In 1992, all higher-level officials were fired, with the minister and vice-minister and their families being arrested and sent to prison camps for embezzlement, and wasting funds buying worn out fibre optic-producing equipment from the UK.

Since 1993, there has been a fibre optic telephone service available in places, which residents call the "light telephone". This has reduced the reliance of citizens on telegrams and letters.

Postal system
Each province has a branch of the Ministry of Post and Telecommunications and each "Ri" (village) has a postal service office to deliver letters, packages and telegrams. Agents of the North Korean Ministry of State Security are stationed at the Ministry's office to inspect mail and monitor residents.

Despite having a postal system and other state-run communications organizations, word of mouth remains the most common way information is spread throughout the country.

International
Postal services between North and South Korea do not exist. North Korea is under multiple economic sanctions which severely limit what can legally be sent to the country. In the United States, any mail is regulated by the Office of Foreign Assets Control and limits mail to first-class letters/postcards and matter for the blind. All merchandise, currency, precious metals, jewellery, chemical/biological/radioactive materials and others are prohibited.

See also

 Postage stamps and postal history of North Korea
 Telecommunications in North Korea
 Censorship in North Korea
 Media of North Korea
 Sanctions against North Korea
 Vietnam Post Corporation
 Brunei Postal Services Department
 Mongol Post

References

External links

 Sanctions Against North Korea at Global Policy Forum

Communications in North Korea
Government of North Korea
Korea, North